Eleutherodactylus intermedius is a species of frog in the family Eleutherodactylidae endemic to eastern Cuba where it is known from the Sierra Maestra and Sierra del Cobre. Its common name is Pico Turquino robber frog, in reference to its type locality.

Description
Colour varies from light gray to very dark brown, with various marbling or mottling. Some individuals have narrow, whitish dorsolateral streaks or a narrow, whitish mid-dorsal line. The digits are small and without digital discs. Toes have no webbing.

Habitat and conservation
The species' natural habitat is moist closed forest. They are active at night, hiding under rocks, logs and other objects during the day.

E. intermedius is uncommon even in suitable habitat. It is threatened by habitat loss, even with the Turquino and La Bayamesa National Parks where it occurs.

References

intermedius
Endemic fauna of Cuba
Amphibians of Cuba
Amphibians described in 1937
Taxonomy articles created by Polbot
Taxa named by Thomas Barbour
Taxa named by Benjamin Shreve